Axiocerses croesus, the dark-banded scarlet, is a butterfly of the family Lycaenidae. It is found in the Eastern Cape, west up to Port Elizabeth and into Kwazulu-Natal.

The wingspan is 24–32 mm for males and 25–34 mm for females. Adults are on wing year-round in the northern part of the range.  There are two generations per year in the south with adults on wing from September to October and from February to May.

The larvae feed on Acacia species.

References

External links
 

Butterflies described in 1862
Axiocerses
Endemic butterflies of South Africa